Víctor Rangel Ayala (born 11 March 1957) is a Mexican former footballer, currently manager of Atlético Mexiquense of the Mexican Primera Division A.

Career
Born in Mexico City, Rangel played club football for Club Deportivo Guadalajara, Club León, Atlético Potosino and Ángeles de Puebla. He won a gold medal in football at the 1975 Pan American Games. He scored 3 goals at the 1976 Olympic Games and he scored 1 goal for the Mexico national football team in the 1978 FIFA World Cup. He played as a forward.

After he retired from playing, Rangel became a football manager. He led Club Tijuana until December 2007. He was appointed manager of Primera "A" club Atlético Mexiquense in June 2008.

Notes

References

External links
 
 
 

1957 births
Living people
Mexican footballers
Mexico international footballers
Mexican football managers
Association football forwards
Olympic footballers of Mexico
Footballers at the 1976 Summer Olympics
Footballers from Mexico City
1978 FIFA World Cup players
C.D. Guadalajara footballers
Club León footballers
Club Tijuana managers
CONCACAF Championship-winning players
Liga MX players
Pan American Games gold medalists for Mexico
Pan American Games medalists in football
Footballers at the 1975 Pan American Games
Medalists at the 1975 Pan American Games